is a subway station on the Nagoya Municipal Subway Higashiyama Line in Nakagawa-ku, Nagoya, Aichi Prefecture, Japan, operated by Transportation Bureau City of Nagoya.

Lines
Takabata Station is a terminus of the Higashiyama Line subway, and is numbered "H01".

Station layout

Platforms

History
The station opened on 21 September 1982.

Chest-height platform edge doors were installed at the station in September 2015.

See also
 List of railway stations in Japan

References

External links

 Nagoya Subway station information 

Railway stations in Aichi Prefecture
Railway stations in Japan opened in 1982